Mahadevananda Mahavidyalaya, established in 1968, is the general degree college in Manirampur, Barrackpore. It offers undergraduate courses in arts, commerce and sciences. It is affiliated to West Bengal State University.

History 
The college was established by Late Swami Jyotirmoyananda Giri Maharaj, in the memory of Late Swami Mahadevananda Giri Maharaj on the day of Krishna Janmashtami on 15 August 1968. Since 15 August (Independence day of India) being a holiday, the 16th day of August has been officially declared as the Foundation Day.

Departments

Science

Chemistry
Physics
Mathematics 
Botany
Zoology
Physiology
Computer Science
Electronics

Arts and Commerce

Bengali
English
Sanskrit
Hindi
History
Geography
Political Science
Philosophy
Economics
Education
Journalism
Commerce https://www.youtube.com/channel/UCgWJgWg-xmXJsUVgfoIvNBg/featured
Physical Education

Accreditation
Mahadevananda Mahavidyalaya is recognized by the University Grants Commission (UGC). It was accredited by the National Assessment and Accreditation Council (NAAC), and awarded ‘A' grade in January 2016.

See also
Education in India
List of colleges in West Bengal
Education in West Bengal

References

External links
Mahadevananda Mahavidyalaya
Dr. Subrata Mukherjee Distance Learning in Commerce 

Universities and colleges in North 24 Parganas district
Colleges affiliated to West Bengal State University
Educational institutions established in 1968
1968 establishments in West Bengal